Nils Thune (2 March 1898 - 1 April 1988) was a Norwegian politician for the Centre Party.

He served as a deputy representative to the Norwegian Parliament from Oppland during the term 1950–1953.

References

1898 births
1988 deaths
Centre Party (Norway) politicians
Deputy members of the Storting
Oppland politicians